Carol Black can refer to:

 Carol Black (filmmaker) (born  1957), American writer and filmmaker
 Carol M. Black (born 1939), British physician and academic